Chetab-e Sofla (also Romanized as Chetāb-e Soflá; also known as Chetāb-e Āqākarīm and Chetāb-e Āqā Karīm) is a village in Garmeh-ye Jonubi Rural District, in the Central District of Meyaneh County, East Azerbaijan Province, Iran. At the 2006 census, its population was 175, in 43 families.

References 

Populated places in Meyaneh County